Take a Chance is a comedy play by the British-American writer Walter C. Hackett, with a plot revolving around gambling on a horseracing.

It was performed at the Whitehall Theatre, running for 93 performances between 28 July and 17 October 1931. It followed closely on the heels of another of Hackett's plays at the theatre Good Losers. The original cast of Take a Chance included Ian Hunter, Ronald Shiner, Charles Quatermaine, Anthony Holles, Francis Lister, Hugh Wakefield, Barbara Hoffe and Marion Lorne.

Adaptation
It provided the basis for a loose adaptation into the 1937 film of the same title directed by Sinclair Hill and starring Claude Hulbert and Binnie Hale.

References

Bibliography
 Goble, Alan. The Complete Index to Literary Sources in Film. Walter de Gruyter, 1999.
 Wearing, J.P. The London Stage 1930-1939: A Calendar of Productions, Performers, and Personnel.  Rowman & Littlefield, 2014.

1931 plays
British plays adapted into films
West End plays
Comedy plays
Plays by Walter C. Hackett